Michael Short may refer to:
 Michael Short (linguist)
 Michael Short (engineer)